Isabelle Boulay,  (born 6 July 1972) is a French Canadian singer.

Biography
Born in Sainte-Félicité, Quebec, where her parents owned a restaurant, Boulay moved to the nearby city of Matane at the start of her adolescence, and studied literature at Cégep Limoilou.  In 1988, her friends signed her up, without her knowledge, for a singing contest in Matane, where she made the acquaintance of Josélito Michaud, who later became her agent.  In 1990, at the Petite-Vallée song festival, she won an award for her performance of "Les gens de mon pays" (Gilles Vigneault).  The following year, in 1991, she won the Granby song festival for her rendition of "Amsterdam" (Jacques Brel) and "Naufrage" (Dan Bigras). She was also invited to take part in the festival Les FrancoFolies de Montréal.  In 1992, she performed in France at Théâtre Dejazet, introducing Bill Deraime.  In 1993, she represented Radio Canada at the "Truffe de Périgueux" festival held in Périgord, France, and was awarded the prize for Best Singer in the "chanson francophone" category.

Following Boulay's success in France, she was noticed by songwriter Luc Plamondon, who was looking for emerging talents to perform in a new production of his rock opera Starmania. There, Boulay portrayed the role of Marie-Jeanne from 1995 to 1998.  She also provided the singing voice for Quebec singer Alys Robi in the TV miniseries of the same name, adding to her popularity in Quebec.

In 1996, Boulay released her debut album, Fallait pas, written and produced by Daniel DeShaime. She also participated again in Les FrancoFolies de Montréal. She began recording her second album, États d'amour, in 1997; it was released in Quebec February 1998 and sold well, being certified as gold by September.  The album was released in France in November.  In 1998 she was also nominated for four Félix Awards but failed to win any. In 1999, the single "Je t'oublierai, je t'oublierai" from États d'amour peaked at No. 33 on the French charts. Boulay made a number of media appearances in France in 1999, and, in the summer, sang again in the FrancoFolies de Montréal, where the live album Scènes d'amour was recorded.  She also performed with Serge Lama at the Olympia, and introduced Francis Cabrel on tour, as well as introducing Julien Clerc during his tour in Montreal.  In October, she was given the Félix award for female singer of the year.

Since then, she has had considerable success both in Quebec and in Europe. Her biggest-selling album in France was the 2000 release Parle-moi. On 14 February 2008, she was presented with the medal of the National Assembly of Quebec by the mayor of her hometown, in recognition of her contribution to the arts.

She has been a coach on La Voix for its second, third, and fifth edition, respectively.

In March 2019, she was one of 11 singers from Quebec, alongside Ginette Reno, Diane Dufresne, Céline Dion, Luce Dufault, Louise Forestier, Laurence Jalbert, Catherine Major, Ariane Moffatt, Marie Denise Pelletier and Marie-Élaine Thibert, who participated in a supergroup recording of Renée Claude's 1971 single "Tu trouveras la paix" after Claude's diagnosis with Alzheimer's disease was announced.

Personal life
In October 2008, Boulay and her producer Marc-Andre Chicoine, had their first child together, Marcus Andrew.

She is in 2020 living with the French minister of Justice, Éric Dupond-Moretti.

Awards and recognition

 1999, 2000, 2001, 2002, 2003, 2007, 2008: Félix Award: Female singer of the year
 2000: Félix Award: Pop album of the year (Scènes d'amour)
 2001: Victoires de la musique: discovery of the year for artist and album (Mieux qu'ici-bas)
 2001: Félix Awards: Pop album of the year (Mieux qu'ici-bas)
 2001, 2005, 2007, 2008: Félix Award: Show of the year (singer)
 2001: Juno Awards: nomination for Best Female Artist, two nominations for Best Selling Francophone Album (Mieux qu'ici bas, Scènes d'Amour)
 2005, 2008: Félix Award: Quebec artist best known outside Quebec
 2007: Félix Award: Country album of the year (De retour à la source)
 2008: Juno Awards: nomination for Francophone Album of the Year (De retour à la source)
 2012: Made a Knight of the National Order of Quebec
 2012: Made a knight of the Order of La Pléiade

Discography

Studio albums

Live albums

Compilations

Soundtracks

Singles

External links
 
 Quebec Info Musique: Isabelle Boulay

References

1972 births
Living people
French-language singers of Canada
French Quebecers
Knights of the National Order of Quebec
Singers from Quebec
People from Bas-Saint-Laurent
Canadian women country singers
Canadian country singer-songwriters
Canadian women pop singers
20th-century Canadian women singers
21st-century Canadian women singers
Félix Award winners